The anterior colliculus is the anterior portion of the medial malleolus of the distal tibia, forming part of the ankle mortise. It has an attachment of the anterior tibiotalar ligament.

References

See also

Tibia